Glacisgården is a listed, Jugendstil-style building located at Østbanegade 11 in the Østerbro district of Copenhagen, Denmark.

History
Glacisgården takes its name after the glacis outside Copenhagen's East Rampart which was located at the site until the second half of the 19th century. The building was constructed in 1903-04 to design by Aage Langeland-Mathiesen.

Architecture
The building is designed in the Jugendstil. The design is strongly inspired by an Arthur Meinig building from 1898 at József Attila utca 8 in Budapest.

References

External links

 Images at arkitekturbilleder.dk

Apartment buildings in Copenhagen
Listed residential buildings in Copenhagen
Listed buildings and structures in Østerbro
Residential buildings completed in 1904